
Gmina Poddębice is an urban-rural gmina (administrative district) in Poddębice County, Łódź Voivodeship, in central Poland.

Communities 
Gmina Poddębice contains the villages and settlements of 
 Adamów
 Antonina
 Bałdrzychów
 Balin
 Bliźnia
 Borzewisko
 Busina
 Chropy
 Chropy-Kolonia
 Dominikowice
 Dzierzązna
 Ewelinów
 Feliksów
 Gibaszew
 Golice
 Góra Bałdrzychowska
 Góra Bałdrzychowska-Kolonia
 Grocholice
 Jabłonka
 Józefów
 Józefów-Kolonia
 Kałów
 Karnice
 Klementów
 Kobylniki
 Krępa
 Ksawercin
 Leśnik
 Łężki
 Lipki
 Lipnica
 Lubiszewice
 Małe
 Malenie
 Niemysłów
 Niewiesz
 Niewiesz-Kolonia
 Nowa Wieś
 Nowy Pudłów
 Panaszew
 Poddębice - Gmina seat
 Podgórcze
 Porczyny
 Praga
 Pudłówek
 Rąkczyn
 Sempółki
 Stary Pudłów
 Sworawa
 Szarów
 Tarnowa
 Tumusin
 Wilczków
 Wólka
 Zagórzyce

Neighbouring gminas
Gmina Poddębice is bordered by the gminas of Dalików, Dobra, Lutomiersk, Pęczniew, Uniejów, Wartkowice and Zadzim.

References
Polish official population figures 2006

Poddebice
Poddębice County